Friedrich Lombard (born 4 March 1979) is a South African former rugby union player.

Playing career
Lombard was born and raised in the Free State town of Frankfort. After school, he studied at the University of the Free State.

Lombard made his test match debut for the Springboks against  at the Murrayfield, Edinburgh in 2002. Following the Scotland test, he also played in the test against .

Test history

See also
List of South Africa national rugby union players – Springbok no. 736

References

1979 births
Living people
South African rugby union players
South Africa international rugby union players
Free State Cheetahs players
Bulls (rugby union) players
Lions (United Rugby Championship) players
Rugby union fullbacks
Rugby union wings
Rugby union players from the Free State (province)